Nicolas Christian Meister (born May 15, 1989) is an American tennis player.

Meister has a career high ATP singles ranking of 263 achieved on June 13, 2016. He also has a career high ATP doubles ranking of 180 achieved on September 26, 2016.

Meister made his ATP main draw debut at the 2012 Farmers Classic where he qualified for the main draw, defeating Ilija Bozoljac, Rik de Voest and Jimmy Wang in the qualifying rounds. In the main draw he lost in the first round to the fifth seed Xavier Malisse, 4–6, 1–6. He was also given a wildcard into the doubles event partnering Marcos Giron, where they lost in the first round to Rajeev Ram and Michael Russell in straight sets.

Four years later, Meister made his Grand Slam debut when he received a wildcard entry into the 2016 US Open Men's Doubles tournament alongside countryman Eric Quigley. They were defeated in the first round by eventual quarter-finalists Łukasz Kubot and Alexander Peya.

Meister has graduated from UCLA Bruins.

External links
 
 
 UCLA profile

1989 births
Living people
American male tennis players
Tennis players from Los Angeles
Sportspeople from Santa Ana, California
UCLA Bruins men's tennis players
20th-century American people
21st-century American people